Hans Friderichs (born 16 October 1931) is a German politician who served as the minister of economy in the period 1972–1977. He is also a jurist and businessman.

Early life and education
Friderichs was born in Wittlich in 1931. He received a bachelor's degree in law and political science and also, holds a PhD.

Career
Friderichs was a member and leader of the Free Democrats. Until 1964 he was the deputy chairman of the party in North Rhine-Westphalia and then he became the chairman. He served as a member of the German Bundestag twice, from 1965 to 1969 and from 1972 to 1977.  He was the minister of economy from 15 December 1972 to 7 October 1977. He first served in the cabinet led by Prime Minister Willy Brandt.

After leaving office, Friderichs worked in various capacities at different firms and institutions, including Adidas AG. In October 1977 he was named as the board member of the Dresdner Bank, replacing Jürgen Ponto who had been murdered. Until March 1985, he served as the head of the bank. He was the deputy chairman of the supervisory board of Adidas AG until 2007. On 7 November 2007, he was appointed chairman of the board and served in the post until 2009.

Controversy
Friderichs together with other German politicians was convicted and heavily sentenced for tax evasion, known as Flick affair, in 1985.

References

External links

21st-century German businesspeople
1931 births
Adidas people
German corporate directors
Economy ministers of Germany
German bankers
Jurists from Rhineland-Palatinate
Living people
Members of the Bundestag for Rhineland-Palatinate
Members of the Bundestag 1976–1980
Members of the Bundestag 1965–1969
Members of the Landtag of Rhineland-Palatinate
Members of the Bundestag for the Free Democratic Party (Germany)
People from the Rhine Province
People from Wittlich